Salt Creek Township is one of the twenty-one townships of Tama County, Iowa, United States.

History
Salt Creek Township was organized in 1856. It is named from the Salt Creek.

References

Townships in Tama County, Iowa
Townships in Iowa